Sielski (feminine: Sielska; plural: Sielscy) is a surname. Notable people with this surname include:

 Aleksander Sielski (1610–1682), Polish noble
 Margit Sielska-Reich (1900–1980), Polish-Ukrainian painter

See also
 

Polish-language surnames